Grand Tracadie  was a municipality that holds community status in Prince Edward Island, Canada. It was incorporated in 1984. The village itself was located in the central portion of Prince Edward Island. On September 28, 2018, it was merged with the municipality of North Shore.  Grand Tracadie finds itself partly in a National Park of Canada.  It is close to Charlottetown, the cultural hub of P.E.I.

Hotel Acadia and Acadia Spring 
The Hotel Acadia was a popular beach and wellness resort that operated for 12 seasons. The hotel opened its doors in the spring of 1894.  This establishment gave Tracadie Beach the enviable reputation of being a health resort for those "run down" by overwork and nervous strain, and has undoubtedly resorted to robust health and renewed mental vigor many whose physical and mental depression was a great anxiety to their friends.

The hotel tragically burned down on August 6, 1906.

The Hotel was acknowledged for its excellent Acadian cuisine.  This popular cuisine consisted of many fresh fish including: mackerel, codfish, haddock, lobster, clams, salmon, trout and other sea and harbour fish. The use of local meats, fruits and vegetables helped drive the admiration for this excellent cuisine. This food laid the ground work for what was to become known as folk food.

See also 
List of communities in Prince Edward Island

References 

Communities in Queens County, Prince Edward Island
Former rural municipalities in Prince Edward Island
Populated places disestablished in 2018